Mayurbhanj district is one of the 30 districts in Odisha state in eastern India. It is the largest district of Odisha by area. Its headquarters are at Baripada. Other major towns are Rairangpur, Karanjia and Bahalda. , it is the third-most-populous district of Odisha (out of 30), after Ganjam and Cuttack.

Etymology
The name of the district is a portmanteau of Mayura (meaning peacock in Odia) and Bhanja, the name of the two ruling dynasty of the district till 1949. It is believed that the Mayura was the name of another dynasty that merged with the Bhanjas sometime around the 14th century. The peacock motif was later adopted by the Bhanjas and featured on the Mayurbhanj coat of arms. The Mayurbhanj alternative spellings were noted as Mohurbunge and Morbhanj in many British India records.

History

The Bhanja family who ruled Mayurbhanj State are closely associated with the district's history. They probably displaced an earlier ruling family with the same name who had ruled from Khiching after the fall of the Buddhist Bhauma-Kara dynasty. The progenitor of the present day Bhanjas shifted the capital from Khiching to Haripur after the kingdom had been plundered by Feroz Shah Tughlaq. Mayurbhanj was an extensive domain at the time of the Mughal conquest in 1592 and covered present day Kendujhar, Balasore, Singhbhum and large parts of undivided Midnapore districts as well. Raja Krushna Chandra Bhanja took advantage of the disturbed conditions around the last years of Shah Jahan and further enlarged his territories. He was however defeated and executed by Khan e Dauran, the general of Emperor Aurangzeb.

During the expansion of the Maratha Empire, the kingdom lost all its territories along the coast as well as the Nilgiri State. The loss of the sea ports along the Balasore coast severely affected the state finances. It was around this time that the capital was shifted to Baripada. In 1803, the state submitted to the British who had conquered coastal Odisha and the state was recognised as a feudatory state – a position midway between a princely state and a Zamindari. Further territorial concessions were made to the British in the 19th century when large parts of present-day West Singhbhum district were handed over in the consequence of persistent Santal rebellions.

The state was modernised during the short reign of Maharaja Sriram Chandra Bhanj Deo in the early 20th century. The railway, primary education, municipal governance and healthcare were all introduced around this time. He also allowed the Jamsetji Tata to mine iron ore at Gorumahisani leading to the establishment of Jamshedpur and Tata Steel just outside the state borders. In a notable judgement during his reign, the Calcutta High Court held that the Mayurbhanj State as well as all other feudatory states of Odisha were not parts of British India, thus elevating them to the status of full princely states. Mayurbhanj was the largest and most populous of all princely states in Odisha and the Maharaja enjoyed a salute of 9 guns.

The Maharaja, Sir Pratap Chandra Bhanjdeo, transferred his executive power to a popularly elected ministry in December 1947 after Indian Independence. However, owing to mismanagement and a large scale rebellion that broke out among the tribals, he signed the Instrument of Accession to India in 1948 resulting in the State becoming a district of Odisha from 1949.

Geography and climate
It is bordered on the northeast by Jhargram district of West Bengal and East Singhbhum district of Jharkhand, to the north by Seraikela Kharsawan district of Jharkhand, West Singhbhum district of Jharkhand on the west, Kendujhar district on the southwest and Balasore district on the southeast.

Mayurbhanj's geography is defined by the Simlipal National Park located in the centre of the district. Covering more than a fourth of the district's area, these forests surround the Simlipal Hills, which form the watershed for the district. The hills reach a height of 3824 feet at Meghasani towards the south and also have many other peaks above 2500 feet. The northern parts of these hills have been mined for iron ore for more than a century. The country to the east of Simlipal is an extension of the Odisha coastal plains and is drained by the Subarnarekha River and Budhabalanga River along with their tributaries. The land is almost level with a slight slope to the coast. The indigenous vegetation consisted of pure Sal forests which have now been replaced by paddy cultivation.

The western plains of Mayurbhanj are an extension of the Odisha Plateau. They are mostly flat with small hills and slopes but are at a higher altitude than the eastern plains, the height rising from north to south. The streams here drain into the Baitarani River in Kendujhar or flow into Jharkhand to the north. There are still isolated open forests to be seen, but paddy is the most common cultivated crop.

The Budhabalanga is the main river of Mayurbhanj. It arises in the Simlipal Hills and forms the waterfall at Barehipani in a northward course. It then turns to the south east and flows between steep banks and sandbars. Both Baripada and the ancient capital of Haripur are located along its banks. The river receives two small tributaries before entering the Bay of Bengal beyond Balasore. Other important minor rivers are Deo, Sone, Gangahar and Salandi. Floods are uncommon except during exceptional rainfall in the hills owing to the seasonal nature of the streams and their steep banks.

The climate of Mayurbhanj is sub tropical marked by high humidity and rainfall during the Monsoon. The Simlipal Hills influence the weather substantially and exhibit higher rainfall and lower maximum temperatures than the rest of the district. Summer temperatures in Baripada can occasionally cross 45 degree Celsius but thunderstorms in the evening are common which have a moderating influence. Minimum temperature in winter can go down to 8 degrees. Fog occurs occasionally during winters.

Transport
The road network of Mayurbhanj is organised in a circular manner owing to the presence of the Simlipal Hills and forest in the centre of the district. National Highway 18 takes off from the Kolkata-Chennai highway near Simulia in Balasore. It shortly thereafter enters the district and passes the major villages of Baisinga, Betnoti and Krushnachandrapur before crossing Baripada and Jharpokharia.

National Highway 49 also enters the district at Jamsola. It then crosses Bangriposi and Jashipur before entering Kendujhar district. This is the main highway connecting Kolkata with Mumbai and therefore sees heavy traffic throughout the year. National Highway 220 covers the stretch from Karanjia to Tiring passing through Jashipur and Rairangpur on the way. Odisha state highway 19 is another important state highways link the district headquarter Baripada from Jaleswar, Udala and Gopiballavpur I of West Bengal.

The Mayurbhanj State Railway was a  narrow gauge line funded by the Mayurbhanj State that connected Talbandh in the Simlipal Hills to Rupsa on the Bengal Nagpur Railway mainline, mainly to carry timber. The major stations enroute were Bangriposi and Baripada. The line was shut down in 2002 and reopened after conversion to broad gauge in 2007. The Talbandh-Bangriposi stretch has been abandoned for many years now and the line terminates at the latter station. Another electrified broad-gauge line from Jamshedpur enters the district at Bahalda before splitting at Aunlajhori. One branch goes to Badampahar while the other terminates at Gorumahisani. Both these routes fall under the South Eastern Railway.

Mayurbhanj has no active airports although RAF Amarda Road was a major base for the Royal Air Force and the United States Army Air Forces during World War II. Another abandoned airfield, once used by the Maharaja of Mayurbhanj, is located at Rajabasa near Baripada.

Administration
The District is headed by the Collector and District magistrate, usually an officer of the Indian Administrative Service (IAS) who oversees development, revenue collection and maintenance of law and order. He is assisted at headquarters by two Additional District Magistrates (ADM) and a number of Deputy Collectors. Various line departments ranging from Agriculture and Education to Health are operate under the Collector's supervision. There are four territorial subdivisions of the district – Sadar (headquartered at Baripada), Kaptipada (Udala), Bamanghaty (Rairangpur) and Panchpir (Karanjia) composing 26 blocks, 382 Gram Panchayats and 3945 villages. Each subdivision is headed by a Sub Collector cum Sub Divisional Magistrate who reports to the Collector. Except for the Sadar Sub Collector, who is often an IAS officer, the other Sub Collectors and ADMs belong to the Odisha Administrative Service.

The police force is headed by a Superintendent of Police belonging to the Indian Police Service who is assisted by Additional SPs at headquarters and SDPOs at subdivisional headquarters. There are a total of 32 police stations – each headed by an Inspector or Sub Inspector in-charge. While the Superintendent reports on general law and order matters to the District Magistrate, he is almost completely independent in practice as far as the police force is concerned.

Each subdivision is further divided into blocks and tahsils. The former are development units headed by a Block Development Officer. Each block is divided into numerous Gram Panchayats (GPs) for a total of 404 in the district. The GPs and Blocks report to the Project Director, District Rural Development Authority (DRDA), an ADM rank officer. The Collector is the CEO of DRDA and thus exercises direct control over its functioning. The tahsils on the other hand are revenue subdivisions with the Tahsildar also being an Executive Magistrate and reporting to the Sub Collector. He is assisted by a number of Revenue Inspectors and Amins. The district has a total of 26 blocks and tahsils, the highest in Odisha.

The Simlipal National Park, while formally a part of the four subdivisions noted above, is in practice under a Field Director belonging to the Indian Forest Service (IFS). The Deputy Director, also an IFS officer, is responsible for the day-to-day operations of the Park. Three other Divisional Forest Officers are in charge of the forests outside the National Park area.

The Judiciary is headed by a District and Sessions Judge who exercises both criminal and civil jurisdiction. He also enjoys revisionary powers over certain orders of the District Magistrate and Sub Divisional Magistrates. He is assisted on the civil side by Civil Judges of senior and junior divisions and on the criminal side by Chief Judicial Magistrate and Sub Divisional Judicial Magistrates.

Demographics

According to the 2011 census Mayurbhanj district has a population of 2,519,738, roughly equal to the nation of Kuwait or the US state of Nevada. This gives it a ranking of 171st in India (out of a total of 640). Its population growth rate over the decade 2001–2011 was 13.06%. Mayurbhanj has a sex ratio of 1006 females for every 1000 males, much higher than the Indian average of 940 and a literacy rate of 63.98%, slightly lower than the Indian average. Scheduled Castes and Scheduled Tribes make up 7.33% and 58.72% of the population respectively. The bulk of the population is concentrated in the Sadar and Kaptipada subdivisions which border the fertile coastal Odisha plains and are part of an extensive rice growing region. Bamanghat also has a large population engaged in agriculture and industry.

Tribes and communities
The Odia people form the largest population segment. Their castes are the same as that of the neighbouring district of Balasore. A distinctive feature is the presence of many communities that originally hailed from West Bengal but have completely integrated with the Odia population in the last two centuries. The Odias are especially dominant in the Kaptipada subdivision and in the adjoining blocks of Sadar. Odia Scheduled Castes make up 7.32% of the population and belong to a wide variety of groups, with no one community dominating.

Tribals are the largest group forming 58.72% of the population. The Santal people are the largest tribe and are the second-largest group in the district as a whole. A large number of them are immigrants from what is now Singhbhum during the 18th and 19th centuries. The practice of shifting cultivation and jungle clearance meant that the Santals were always on the lookout for forested uncultivated land that could take pressure of a growing population. Increasingly, the Santals settled in Mayurbhanj acquired some degree of fluency in Odia while continuing to speak Santali among themselves. The Ho people form the second largest tribal group followed by the Bhumij. All three tribes speak languages that are a part of the Munda languages family and are therefore distinct from the prevalent Indo Aryan languages of Odia and Hindi that are spoken nearby. The Bhumij, on the other hand, have mostly adopted Odia as their language although 40% still speak Bhumij. Other tribes include the Odia-speaking Bathudia, Bhumia and Gonds, as well as the Sounti and Kharia. As per 1931 census, the district was comprised by 131 different communities, primarily by Santal (28.61%), Ho (Kolha) (12.07%), Bhumij (8.71%), Kudumi Mahato (6.77%), Bathudi (5.19%), Goura (4.39%), Pana Tanti (3.38%), Bhuyan (2.62%), Khandaita (2.23%), Bhanja Purana (2.2%) and other communities like Kamar, Kumbhar, Gond, Kharia, Brahmin, Teli, Saunti, Dhoba, Tanti, Gola, Dom, Bhandari, Karana, Patra, Baisnaba, Ghasi, Sadgop, Mahali, Sabara, Amanta / Dhandachhatra Majhi, Sundhi, Pan (Jena Pan), Purana, Keut, Hadi, Raju, Kshatriya, Ujia, Bagal, Gouria, Rarhi, Oraon, Baisa, Karua, Thatari, Sahara, Kayastha, Rajuar, Munda constitute 20.35% with each community shared by 0.9% to 2.0%. The rest of 3.24% was shared by minority communities whose population below 1,000 in the district.

Religion 

According to the 2011 Census 83.86% people are Hindus, 1.34% are Muslims, 0.60% are Christians, 0.03% are Sikhs and Jains while Adivasi faiths comprise the rest. Hinduism in its usual form is practised by the Odia people. Baripada is an important religious centre, having one of the oldest Jagannath temples in the state as well as a much revered temple of Maa Ambika, the patron deity of the town. Semi Buddhistic practises involving the worship of Mahayana deities like Tara and Avalokiteshvara under different names are common in villages. A large segment of the tribal population also follows Hinduism with a substantial amount of tribal rites and rituals. The ancestral faith of Santals, Sarna involves nature worship and reverence for sacred groves and is also widely practised.
 
Muslims and Christians comprise a tiny minority. The former are almost all migrants from Coastal Odisha except for a sizeable population of Bihari Muslims near the border with Chaibasa. Christians are mostly converts from tribal communities. There is an old Evangelical Church at Baripada and a Roman Catholic church at Krushnachandrapur.

Languages

At the time of the 2011 Census of India, 54.33% of the population in the district spoke Odia, 24.81% Santali, 7.58% Ho, 3.92% Mundari, 2.77% Kurmali and 1.34% Bengali as their first language.

A large segment of the tribal population is fluent in Odia in addition to their native language. The Mayurbhanj dialect is almost the same as that of Coastal Odisha though certain tribal words for everyday objects are used, especially in the villages. The native language of Santali is largely used in its spoken form, Odia or Hindi being preferred for writing. The Ol Chiki script is rarely seen and the Odia script is used to write other tribal languages as well. Bengali is used in the parts of Sadar subdivision that adjoin Jhargram district, although there is significant Odia admixture. Kudmali is another important language, primarily spoken by the Kudumi Mahato in the border areas of Jharkhand and West Bengal. Where they have significant population. Other tribal languages include Ho and Bhumij (sometimes regarded as a Mundari dialect). Lodha is spoken by several thousand people.

Politics

The following is the nine Vidhan sabha constituencies of Mayurbhanj district.

See also
 Mayurbhanj State
 Simlipal National Park
 Khiching
 Belgadia Palace

References

Bibliography

Notes

External links

 

 
Districts of Odisha